The Maybelline Classic, also known as the Lynda Carter Maybelline Classic, is a defunct women's tennis tournament created by tennis promoter George Liddy which was first held in 1980 and played every year until 1985. It was held at the Deer Creek Racquet Club in Deerfield Beach, Florida (1980–1983) and at the Bonaventure Racquet Club in Fort Lauderdale, Florida (1984–1985), in the United States and played on outdoor hard courts.

Results

Singles

Doubles

References

 
Maybelline Classic
Hard court tennis tournaments
Maybelline
Deerfield Beach, Florida
1980 establishments in Florida
1985 disestablishments in Florida
Recurring sporting events established in 1980
Recurring sporting events disestablished in 1985
Sports in Fort Lauderdale, Florida